New York's 23rd State Senate district is one of 63 districts in the New York State Senate. It has been represented by Democrat Jessica Scarcella-Spanton since 2023. Spanton has been an active member in New York politics and was a campaign manager for her predecessor Diane Savino, who represented the district from 2005 until her retirement in 2022.

Geography
District 23 covers much of the North Shore of Staten Island, including the neighborhoods of Marines Harbor, Elm Park, West New Brighton, St. George, Stapleton Heights, Arrochar, and Dongan Hills. The district also encompasses parts of some southern Brooklyn neighborhoods, including Bensonhurst, Brighton Beach, Coney Island, Dyker Heights, Gravesend, and Sunset Park.

The district overlaps with New York's 7th, 8th, 9th, 10th, and 11th congressional districts, and with the 41st, 45th, 46th, 47th, 49th, 51st, 61st, 63rd, and 64th districts of the New York State Assembly.

Recent election results

2022

2020

2018

2016

2014

2012

Federal results in District 23

References

23